Stonewall Jackson Lake is an  impoundment on the West Fork River in Lewis County, West Virginia.  The lake is a flood control project of the Pittsburgh District of the United States Army Corps of Engineers and named for Thomas "Stonewall" Jackson, a native of Lewis County.  Stonewall Resort is located along the lake's shore.  Facilities provided by the Corps of Engineers included a visitors center with public restrooms, a hiking trail, and fishing access.

Downstream towns and cities protected by the lake include Weston, Clarksburg, Shinnston, and Fairmont, all in West Virginia

The lake is a popular spot for largemouth bass fishing.  A list of fishing species in the lake include:
 Crappie
 Walleye
 Bluegill
 Yellow perch
 Muskellunge
 Channel catfish
 Bullhead
 Carp

Trout is stocked in the lake's tailwaters.

References

Bodies of water of Lewis County, West Virginia
Reservoirs in West Virginia
Dams in West Virginia
Dams completed in 1986
United States Army Corps of Engineers dams
IUCN Category V